Robert Costa may refer to:

 Robert Costa (footballer) (born 1994), Spanish footballer
 Robert Costa (journalist) (born 1985), political reporter for The Washington Post
 Robert A. Costa (born 1958), American politician and member of the Maryland House of Delegates

See also 
 Bob Costas (sportscaster born 1952 as Robert Quinlan Costas)